USS Lebanon (AK-191) was a  constructed for the US Navy during the end of World War II. However, as the war was ending, the need for additional cargo ships was found not necessary and Lebanon was sold for commercial service.

Construction
Lebanon, the second U.S. Navy ship to bear that name, was laid down under a Maritime Commission contract, MC hull 2122, by Walter Butler Shipbuilding Co., Superior, Wisconsin, 15 May 1944; launched 14 October 1944; sponsored by Mrs. Charles E. Denny; acquired by the Navy 25 August 1945; and commissioned at New Orleans, Louisiana, 26 September 1945.

Service history

World War II-related service
The end of World War II reduced the need for cargo ships and Lebanon decommissioned 15 November 1946. She was returned to the Maritime Commission the same day, was chartered to Lykes Brothers Steamship Company, Inc., and renamed Coastal Archer.

Merchant service
Coastal Archer was used by several shipping companies from 1945–1948, when she was placed in the reserve fleet.

On 13 July 1956, she was sold to Brazil under the condition that she be used for coastal shipping by Brazil. She was delivered on 22 August 1956. Her final disposition is unknown.

Notes 

Citations

Bibliography 

Online resources

External links

 

Alamosa-class cargo ships
Lebanon County, Pennsylvania
Ships built in Superior, Wisconsin
1944 ships
World War II auxiliary ships of the United States